Alessandro Canale (born 15 May 1969) is a former Italian champion high jumper.

Canale won three titles in a row at the national championships at the individual senior level.

National titles
Italian Athletics Indoor Championships
High jump: 1996, 1997
Italian Athletics Indoor Championships
High jump: 1997

References

External links
 

1969 births
Living people
Italian male high jumpers
Sportspeople from Mantua